Mimmo Poli (born Domenico Poli, April 11, 1920 – April 4, 1986) was an Italian film character actor.

Career
He was one of the best known and most active characters of Italian cinema; in his thirty-five-year career he boasted an immense filmography having appeared in over 200 films.  He started from a young age by treading the stages and reciting in Roman dialect.

In 1951 he had a small part in the film Toto and the King of Rome directed by Mario Monicelli.  Since then he became a very special face, loved both by Totò and by Federico Fellini.  He appears everywhere, where you need a bartender, a docker, a prisoner, from the films of the  Monnezza  to those of Bernardo Bertolucci.

Among the most relevant films: The Overcoat (1952) by Alberto Lattuada; Toto in Color (1952) by Steno; Termini Station (1953) by Vittorio De Sica; Beat the Devil by John Huston; Nights of Cabiria (1956) by Federico Fellini; Poveri ma belli (1956) by Dino Risi; Arrangiatevi (1959) by Mauro Bolognini; Totò, Peppino e... la dolce vita (1961) by Sergio Corbucci; The Betrayer (1961) by Roberto Rossellini.  He also appeared in many films of Franco and Ciccio. His last film appearance was with I soliti ignoti vent'anni dopo (1985).

Death
Due to serious health problems, he was forced to leave the scene in the mid-eighties. He died from a heart attack on April 4, 1986, at the age of 65.

Selected filmography

 Anna (1951, directed by Alberto Lattuada) - L'infermiere grasso (uncredited)
 Licenza premio (1951, directed by Max Neufeld)
 Toto in Color (1952, directed by Steno)
 Poppy (1952)
 Inganno (1952, directed by Steno and Mario Monicelli) - Un cliente della trattoria
 Toto and the King of Rome (1952, directed by Steno and Mario Monicelli)
 Toto and the Women (1952, directed by Steno and Mario Monicelli) - Male nurse (uncredited)
 We Two Alone (1952, directed by Steno and Marino Girolami, Marcello Marchesi) - Man at the Bus Stop (uncredited)
 Sette ore di guai (1952, directed by Vittorio Metz, Marcello Marchesi) - 'Sfilatino'
 Il tallone d'Achille (1952, directed by Mario Amendola and Ruggero Maccari)
 The Three Pirates (1952, directed by Mario Soldati)
 Il cappotto (1952, directed by Alberto Lattuada)
 I sette dell'Orsa maggiore (1953, directed by Duilio Coletti) 
 The Unfaithfuls (1953, directed by Mario Monicelli and Steno) - Scorza (uncredited)
 Terminal Station (1953, directed by Vittorio De Sica) - Il grassone nel treno (uncredited)
 At the Edge of the City (1953, directed by Carlo Lizzani, Massimo Mida) - Signore (uncredited)
 Roman Holiday (1953, directed by William Wyler) - Worker Hugging the Three Out Side Police Station (uncredited)
 Il tesoro dell'Africa (1953, directed by John Huston) - Barman (uncredited)
 Ulisse (1954, directed by Mario Camerini) - Procio (uncredited)
 Una pelliccia di visone (1956, directed by Glauco Pellegrini) - Prisoner (uncredited)
 Totò lascia o raddoppia? (1956, directed by Camillo Mastrocinque) - The Man who Pays the Bet (uncredited)
 Mio figlio Nerone (1956, directed by Steno)
 Mi permette, babbo! (1956, directed by Mario Bonnard) - Il primo facchino
 Totò, Peppino e i fuorilegge (1956, directed by Camillo Mastrocinque) - The Bandits' Cook (uncredited)
 Poveri ma belli (1957) - The laughing Customer at 'Antica Roma' (uncredited)
 Fathers and Sons (1957) - Man into the Stadium (uncredited)
 Le notti di Cabiria (1957, directed by Federico Fellini) - Man Eating in the Nightclub (uncredited)
 Il corsaro della mezzaluna (1957, directed by Giuseppe Maria Scotese) - Il corsaro grasso
 Pretty But Poor (1957) - Richetto (uncredited)
 Rascel-Fifì (1957, directed by Guido Leoni) - Malone
 La zia d'America va a sciare (1957, directed by Roberto Bianchi Montero) - Bit Part (uncredited)
 La chiamavan Capinera... (1957)
 Amore e chiacchiere (1958, directed by Alessandro Blasetti)
 Fortunella (1958, directed by Eduardo De Filippo) - Orso Bruno, the wrestler (uncredited)
 Ladro lui, ladra lei (1958, directed by Luigi Zampa) - Remo (uncredited)
 I soliti ignoti (1958, directed by Mario Monicelli) - Prigioniero (uncredited)
 Afrodite, dea dell'amore (1958, directed by Mario Bonnard) - Un Commerciante (uncredited)
 Totò a Parigi (1958, directed by Camillo Mastrocinque) - Il grassone del treno
 Il bacio del sole (Don Vesuvio) (1958, directed by Siro Marcellini) - Il grassone
 L'amore nasce a Roma (1958) - Tancredi
 Men and Noblemen (1959) - The snoring Prisoner (uncredited)
 Everyone's in Love (1959) - Man in Lavatory (uncredited)
 Poveri milionari (1959) - Fat Man on Train (uncredited)
 Il figlio del corsaro rosso (1959, directed by Primo Zeglio) - Tavern's Patron
 Il moralista (1959, directed by Giorgio Bianchi) - The Policeman on a Bicycle (uncredited)
 La duchessa di Santa Lucia (1959, directed by Roberto Bianchi Montero)
 Arrangiatevi! (1959, directed by Mauro Bolognini) - Chicken Vendor (uncredited)
 La cento chilometri (1959, directed by Giulio Petroni) - The Bald Remover (uncredited)
 La notte brava (1959, directed by Mauro Bolognini)
 Il vedovo (1959, directed by Dino Risi) - Man in the Night-club (uncredited)
 Attack of the Moors (1959) - Peasant (uncredited)
 Simpatico mascalzone (1959) - Spettatore a teatro
 Perfide... ma belle! (1959, directed by Giorgio Simonelli) - The fat Lodger at 'Pensione Tecla' (uncredited)
 Nel blu dipinto di blu (1959) - Fat Man at the Bar (uncredited)
 Il raccomandato di ferro (1959) - Lawyer on the Telephone (uncredited)
 Tipi da spiaggia (1959, directed by Mario Mattoli) - Il 'Bagnone' (uncredited)
 Il Mattatore (1960, directed by Dino Risi) - Cook of the Big Restaurant (uncredited)
 Messalina Venere imperatrice (1960, directed by Vittorio Cottafavi) - Drunken Transvestite
 Il principe fusto (1960, directed by Maurizio Arena)
 La strada dei giganti (1960, directed by Guido Malatesta) - Barman (uncredited)
 Totò, Fabrizi e i giovani d'oggi (1960, directed by Mario Mattoli) - (uncredited)
 La baia di Napoli (1960, directed by Melville Shavelson) - Man in Bar (uncredited)
 Il mio amico Jekyll (1960, directed by Marino Girolami) - Rufio
 Caccia al marito (1960, directed by Marino Girolami) - Antonio - the lifeguard (uncredited)
 Morgan il pirata (1960, directed by André De Toth and Primo Zeglio) - Pirate (uncredited)
 Un dollaro di fifa (1960, directed by Giorgio Simonelli) - Zaccaria
 I Teddy boys della canzone (1960, directed by Domenico Paolella) - Un telespettatore (uncredited)
 Ferragosto in bikini (1960, directed by Marino Girolami) - Il padrone del locale
 A qualcuna piace calvo (1960, directed by Mario Amendola) - Uomo alla finestra (uncredited)
 Le Ambiziose (1961, directed by Tony Amendola) - L'onorevole alla festa
 La ragazza sotto il lenzuolo (1961, directed by Marino Girolami) - John Allison
 Totò, Peppino e... la dolce vita (1961, directed by Sergio Corbucci) - Un Ladruncolo (uncredited)
 Il carabiniere a cavallo (1961, directed by Carlo Lizzani) - (uncredited)
 Torna a settembre (Come september) (1961, directed by Robert Mulligan) - Commissario (uncredited)
 Il federale (1961, directed by Luciano Salce) - (uncredited)
 La vendetta della maschera di ferro (1961, directed by Francesco De Feo)
 Vanina Vanini (1961, directed by Roberto Rossellini) - Il boia (uncredited)
 Le magnifiche 7 (1961, directed by Marino Girolami) - Il capitano
 Le avventure di Mary Read (1961, directed by Umberto Lenzi) - Fat man falling
 Romolo e Remo (1961, directed by Sergio Corbucci) - Pastore
 I due marescialli (1961, directed by Sergio Corbucci) - Portalettere
 Barabbas (1961) - Man in Tavern (uncredited)
 Fra' Manisco cerca guai (1961, directed by Armando William Tamburella) - Un frate
 Totò Diabolicus (1962, directed by Steno) - Il postino
 Maciste contro lo sceicco (1962, directed by Domenico Paolella) - Chambelain
 Colpo gobbo all'italiana (1962, directed by Lucio Fulci) - L'oste
 Lo smemorato di Collegno (1962, directed by Sergio Corbucci) - L'Uomo panchina (uncredited)
 Sodoma e Gomorra (1962, directed by Robert Aldrich) - Queen's Cupbearer (uncredited)
 The Changing of the Guard (1962) - Autista dei fascisti (uncredited)
 I motorizzati (1962, directed by Camillo Mastrocinque) - Vittorio (uncredited)
 Carmen, 70 (1962) - Customer Eating Spaghetti (uncredited)
 Totò sexy (1963, directed by Mario Amendola) - Un galeotto - inmate #1
 I due colonnelli (1963, directed by Steno) - Fat Soldier (uncredited)
 Il monaco di Monza (1963, directed by Sergio Corbucci) - Il frate cercatore
 Finché dura la tempesta (1963, directed by Bruno Vailati) - Nightclub Owner
 Gli onorevoli (1963, directed by Sergio Corbucci) - MSI supporter (uncredited)
 Vino, whisky e acqua salata (1963, directed by Mario Amendola) 
 I marziani hanno 12 mani (1964) - Tifoso allo stadio
 Indios a Nord-Ovest (1964)
 Two Mafiamen in the Far West (1964) - Saloon Patron
 I due evasi di Sing Sing (1964, directed by Lucio Fulci) - Speaker
 Il trionfo dei dieci gladiatori (1964, directed by Nick Nostro) - Tavern Owner (uncredited)
 Biblioteca di Studio Uno (1964, TV Mini-Series) - Un carceriere
 I Kill, You Kill (1965) - Sicilian man (segment "Cavalleria Rusticana, oggi")
 Il gladiatore che sfidò l'impero (1965, directed by Domenico Paolella) - Roman at Orgy (uncredited)
 I figli del leopardo (1965, directed by Sergio Corbucci) - Farm manager
 I due sergenti del generale Custer (1965) - Sugar - Barman (uncredited)
 La sfida dei giganti (1965, directed by Maurizio Lucidi) - Gerone
 Altissima pressione (1965, directed by Enzo Trapani) - Il salumiere
 Colorado Charlie (1965, directed by Roberto Mauri) - Jack, Springfield Barman
 Io, io, io... e gli altri (1966, directed by Alessandro Blasetti) - (uncredited)
 All the Way to Paris (1966) - Italian Butcher
 Vacanze sulla neve (1966, directed by Filippo Walter Ratti)
 Caccia alla volpe (1966) - Fat Actor
 Per pochi dollari ancora (1966) - Saloon Patron (uncredited)
 Trappola per sette spie (1966)
 The Hellbenders (1967) - Man in Saloon (uncredited)
 Up the MacGregors (1967) - Barman (uncredited)
 The Honey Pot (1967) - Cook (uncredited)
 Il magnifico Texano (1967, directed by Luigi Capuano) - Barman #2 (uncredited)
 Arriva Dorellik (1967) - Gustavo Dupont (uncredited)
 La cintura di castità (1967) - Minor Role
 L'indomabile Angelica (1967) - Offerer (uncredited)
 Bang Bang Kid (1967, directed by Giorgio Gentili and Luciano Lelli) - Bartender
 La feldmarescialla (1967) - German Soldier (uncredited)
 Gli altri, gli altri,... e noi (1967)
 Se vuoi vivere... spara! (1968) - Bartender
 Il pistolero segnato da Dio (1968) - Barman
 Brutti di notte (1968) - Man in Piazza Navona
 Un minuto per pregare, un istante per morire (1968, directed by Franco Giraldi) – Man in Saloon (uncredited)
 Tre passi nel delirio (1968)  - Taxi Driver / Party Guest (segment "Toby Dammit") (uncredited)
 Donne... botte e bersaglieri (1968) - Lo Giudice (uncredited)
 ...e per tetto un cielo di stelle (1968) - Shopkeeper (uncredited)
 Don Chisciotte and Sancio Panza (1968, directed by Giovanni Grimaldi) - Tavern customer
 Il grande silenzio (1968) - Barman (uncredited)
 Stuntman (1968) - Man with caravan
 Cinque figli di cane (1969, directed by Alfio Caltabiano) - Suitor
 Il ragazzo che sorride (1969, directed by Aldo Grimaldi) - Porter
 I quattro del pater noster (1969) - (uncredited)
 Ehi amico... c'è Sabata. Hai chiuso! (1969) - Hotel Workman (uncredited)
 Una su 13 (1969) - De Seta's Caretaker (uncredited)
 Agguato sul Bosforo (1969) - Informer at Club (uncredited)
 Gli specialisti (1969) - Barman
 Zorro marchese di Navarra (1969, directed by Franco Montemurro) - Taverner
 Poppea's Hot Nights (1969) - Prurient Roman at Market Place (uncredited)
 La donna a una dimensione (1969, directed by Bruno Baratti) - Fatman on TV (uncredited)
 Satiricosissimo (1970) - Party Guest (uncredited)
 Nel giorno del Signore (1970)
 Mio padre monsignore (1971, directed by Antonio Racioppi) - Storyteller
 Riuscirà l'avvocato Franco Benenato a sconfiggere il suo acerrimo nemico il pretore Ciccio De Ingras? (1971) - Barman del saloon (uncredited)
 Er Più – storia d'amore e di coltello (1971) - Owner of 'Cornuto' Restaurant
 Quando gli uomini armarono la clava e... con le donne fecero din don (1971)
 Siamo tutti in libertà provvisoria (1971) - Old Man with Prostitute
 Roma (1972) - Roman Eating in Terrace (uncredited)
 Boccaccio (1972) - Spettatore grasso
 Uomo avvisato mezzo ammazzato... parola di Spirito Santo (1972) - Barman
 My Horse, My Gun, Your Widow (1972, directed by Juan Bosch) - Innkeeper (uncredited)
 Così sia (1972, directed by Alfio Caltabiano) - Bell Ringer (uncredited)
 Sollazzevoli storie di mogli gaudenti e mariti penitenti - Decameron n° 69 (1972) - Frate grasso (uncredited)
 Il terrore con gli occhi storti (1972) - Barman al party
 Lo chiameremo Andrea (1972) - Spot's Actor (uncredited)
 Poppea... una prostituta al servizio dell'impero (1972)
 Il prode Anselmo e il suo scudiero (1972) - Oste
 Storia di fifa e di coltello - Er seguito d'er più (1972)
 Colpo grosso a Porto Said (1972, directed by Luigi Batzella)
 Vogliamo i colonnelli (1973) - Man who sees the flare (uncredited)
 Novelle licenziose di vergini vogliose (1973) - Friar
 Piedone lo sbirro (1973) - (uncredited)
 Polvere di stelle (1973) - (uncredited)
 Diario di una vergine romana (1973) - Livia Fat Customer (uncredited)
 La rivolta delle gladiatrici (1974) - Man at the Orgy (uncredited)
 Trinity Plus the Clown and a Guitar (1975) - Saloon Owner
 La polizia interviene: ordine di uccidere! (1975)
 Squadra antifurto (1976) - Gaetano Bozzetti
 1900 (1976) - Fascist (uncredited)
 Squadra antiscippo (1976) - Vittorio Raganelli detto Il Mussulmano
 Il conto è chiuso (1976, directed by Stelvio Massi) - Garage Owner
 Paura in città (1976, directed by Giuseppe Rosati)
 La banda del trucido (1977) - Barman
 Messalina, Messalina! (1977) - Man in Tavern (uncredited)
 Poliziotto sprint (1977) - Peppone - the informer
 Squadra antitruffa (1977) - Milady (uncredited)
 Il figlio dello sceicco (1977) - Abdul
 La banda del gobbo (1978) - Salvatore (uncredited)
 La Cage aux Folles (1978) - Le barman (uncredited)
 Pari e dispari (1978) - Shop Owner (uncredited)
 Squadra antigangsters (1979) - Arab (in pre-title sequence) (uncredited)
 Neapolitan Mystery (1979) - Asylum cook (uncredited)
 La luna (1979) - Piano Mover
 La liceale, il diavolo e l'acquasanta (1979) - Uomo scippato 
 Sexual aberration - Sesso perverso (1979, directed by Bruno Mattei) - Asian
 Piedone d'Egitto (1980)
 La città delle donne (1980) - Party Guest (uncredited)
 Zucchero, miele e peperoncino (1980) - (uncredited)
 Mi faccio la barca (1980) - Car park attendant
 Delitto a Porta Romana (1980)
 Uno contro l'altro, praticamente amici (1981) - Er Buiaccaro
 Delitto al ristorante cinese (1981) - Gasparotto
 Il Marchese del Grillo (1981) - Oste (uncredited)
 Bomber (1982) - Cook (uncredited)
 Delitto sull'autostrada (1982) - Oste (uncredited)
 Monsignore (1982) - Sicilian Priest
 Pronto... Lucia (1982) - Barman ristorante in Austria (uncredited)
 Dio li fa poi li accoppia (1982) - The Taxi Driver in Rome (uncredited)
 Il conte Tacchia (1982) - Priest (uncredited)
 La sai l'ultima sui matti? (1982) - Matto
 Vieni avanti cretino (1982)
 La casa stregata (1982)
 Il diavolo e l'acquasanta (1983) - Tassista
 A tu per tu (1984)
 Mi faccia causa (1984)
 I soliti ignoti vent'anni dopo (1985) - Cesare

External links

 

20th-century Italian male actors
1920 births
1986 deaths
Italian male film actors
Male actors from Rome